Filmhuset may refer to:
 Filmhuset (building) in Stockholm, the house of the Swedish Film Institute
 Filmhuset AS, a Norwegian film production company